Sodom may refer to:

Places

Historic
 Sodom and Gomorrah, cities mentioned in the Book of Genesis

United States
 Sodom, Kentucky, a ghost town
 Sodom, New York, a hamlet
 Sodom, Ohio, an unincorporated community
 Sodom, West Virginia, an unincorporated community
 Adamant, Vermont or Sodom
 Revere, North Carolina or Sodom
 Sodom, a community within North Canaan, Connecticut

United Kingdom
 Sodom, Shetland, Scotland, UK
 Sodom, Wiltshire, a community near Dauntsey, Wiltshire, UK

Elsewhere
 Sodom, Ontario, Canada
 Mount Sodom or Mount Sedom, Israel
 Winschoten or Sodom, Netherlands

Entertainment 
 Sodom (band), a thrash metal band
 Sodom (album), an album by Sodom
 Sodom, or the Quintessence of Debauchery, a drama
 Sodom (Final Fight), a character in Final Fight and Street Fighter series

Other 
 Sodomy, the sexual practice allegedly common in the Biblical Sodom.

See also
 Sodom and Gomorrah (disambiguation)